

Hosts
Jim McKay (1961–1986); occasionally (1987–1998)
Becky Dixon (1987–1988) 
Frank Gifford (1987–1992)
John Saunders (1993) 
Julie Moran (1994–1995) 
Robin Roberts (1996–1998)

Event announcers

Jesse Abramson
Mike Adamle
Muhammad Ali
Liz Allan
Mel Allen
Donnie Allison
Erin Andrews
Eddie Arcaro
Jack Arute
Arthur Ashe
Paul Azinger
Red Barber
Bob Beamon
Jim Beatty
Stan Benham
Jules Bergman
Chris Berman
Bob Beattie
Jon Beekhuis
Hobie Billingsley
Larry Birleffi
Don Blasingame
Ralph Boston
Bobby Bragan
Tim Brant
Charlie Brockman
Bruce Brown
Lynn Burke
Dick Button
Steve Cauthen
Jennifer Chandler
Don Chevrier
Bill Clement
Cris Collinsworth
Les Connelly
Howard Cosell
Terry Crawford
Donna De Varona
Art Devlin
Dan Dierdorf
Dave Diles
Ken Dryden
Don Drysdale
Chris Economaki
Jack Edwards
Len Elmore
Vic Emery
Stein Erickson
Mike Eruzione
Larry Evans
Nick Faldo
Carlton Fisk
Peggy Fleming
Bill Flemming
George Foreman
Sonny Fox
Russ Francis
Ray Gandolf
Terry Gannon
Paul Gardner
Don Garlits
Gary Gerould
Roger Gibbs
Frank Gifford
Hank Goldberg
Scott Goodyear
Curt Gowdy
Jerry Gross
Muriel Grossfield
Merle Harmon
Bill Hartack
Eric Heiden
Carol Heiss
Russ Hellickson
Fred Hemmings
Jim Hendrick
Anne Henning
Monte Henson
Phil Hill
Keith Jackson
Reggie Jackson
Bob Jenkins
Bruce Jenner
Dave Jennings
Peter Jennings
Dave Johnson
Parker Johnstone
Charlie Jones
Fran Jones
Hayes Jones
James Jones
Alex Karras
Jimmy Key
Billy Kidd
Kirk Kilgour
Billie Jean King
Micki King
Andrea Kirby
Evel Knievel
Bill Koch
Ken Kraft
Jim Lampley
David Letterman
Mark Lieberman
Craig Lincoln
Marty Liquori
John Long
Davey Lopes
Fred Lorenzen
Verne Lundquist
Mario Machado
Gordon Maddux
Larry Mahan
Tom Mahoney
Walter Malmquist
Mickey Mantle
Sal Marchiano
Dave Marr
Chris McCarron
Stew McDonald
Jim McKay
Clem McSpadden
Barry Melrose
Steve Melnyk
Mike Mentzer
Arthur Mercante
Don Meredith
Ann Meyers
Al Michaels
Dick Miles
Cheryl Miller
Bob Montgomery
Julie Moran
John Morgan
Stirling Moss
Bill Muncey
Brent Musburger
Stu Nahan
Joe Namath
Renaldo Nehemiah
Skip Newell
Andy North
Larry Nuber
Diana Nyad
Margo Oberg
Parry O'Brien
Ron O'Brien
Michael O'Hehir
Paul Page
Bud Palmer
Jim Palmer
Darren Pang
Benny Parsons
Dan Patrick
Roger Penske
Jimmy Piersall
Ross Porter
Sam Posey
Cynthia Potter
Jason Priestley
Kirby Puckett
Ronnie Ramsey
Jay Rand
Judy Rankin
Randy Rarick
Marty Reid
Sam Renick
Harold Reynolds
Larry Rice
Bob Richards
Robert Riger
Cathy Rigby
Jimmy Roberts
Kenny Roberts
Robin Roberts
Brooks Robinson
Jackie Robinson
Bob Rose
Murray Rose
Hughes Rudd
Wilma Rudolph
Bill Russell
Johnny Rutherford
Dave Ryan
Maria Sansone
David Santee
Jeanne Saubert
Al Scates
Dick Schapp
Jody Scheckter
Karl Schranz
Judy Scheer
Chris Schenkel
Art Scholl
Don Schollander
Arnold Schwarzenegger
Dave Scott
Vin Scully
Bob Seagren
Erich Segal
Johnny Sellers
Dan Shulman
Anne Simon
Jim Simpson
O. J. Simpson
Ken Sitzberger
Jeff Smith
Mike E. Smith
Tom Sneva
Mark Spitz
Ken Squier
Willie Stargell
Bill Steinkraus
Jackie Stewart
Steve Stone
Dwight Stones
Dennis Storer
Curtis Strange
Danny Sullivan
Rell Sun
Don Sutton
Lynn Swann
Katherine Switzer
Fran Tarkenton
Don Tarr
Kurt Thomas
Shaun Thomson
Michael Thompson
Gary Thorne
Mike Tirico
Bill Toomey
Cheryl Touissant
Al Trautwig
Jack Twyman
Bob Uecker
Bob Varsha
Bill Veeck
Lesley Visser
Dick Vitale
Alex Wallau
Rusty Wallace
Rodger Ward
Earl Weaver
Vince Welch
Billy Welu
Jack Whitaker
Bruce Wilhelm
Ted Williams
George Willig
Warner Wolf
Michael Young
Sheila Young
Steve Zabriskie

Events broadcast on WWOS

Adventure racing 
Aerobatics 
Air shows 
Air races 
Auto racing: CART, NASCAR, Formula One, Endurance car racing, Dirt track racing, Late Model Racing, Modified Racing, Midget car racing, Sprint car racing, Drag racing, Jeep racing, Super truck racing, Dune buggy racing, KART racing, Sports car racing on ice, Touring car racing, Cross country racing 
Auto non-racing: Auto daredevil jumps, Auto thrill shows, Demolition derbies, Figure eights  
Barrel jumping 
Baseball 
Basketball 
Baton twirling 
Beach soccer 
Beach volleyball 
Bikini competitions 
Billiards 
Boat racing: Hydroplane racing, Cutter racing, Dory boat racing, Ice boat racing, Power boat racing, Yacht racing 
Bobsled 
Body building 
Bowling 
Boxing: Men's and women's 
Bridge 
Canoeing 
Chess 
Climbing: Eiffel Tower climbing, Mountain climbing, Rock climbing 
Cricket 
Croquet 
Cycling: Racing, Mountain biking  
Cycloball 
Diving: Platform/Springboard diving, Cliff diving, High diving 
Dog sled racing 
Fencing 
Fighter Interceptor Rocketry 
Figure skating 
Fireman's competition 
Fishing: Great white shark hunting, Tarpon fishing, Trout fishing 
Frisbee 
Frog jumping 
Football: American football, Arena football, Australian Rules football 
Golf 
Gymnastics: Artistic gymnastics, Rhythmic gymnastics 
High wire walking 
Horse racing: Thoroughbred racing, Trotting, Steeplechse, Horse racing on ice 
Horse jumping 
Hurling 
Ice skating marathon 
Kayak 
Lacrosse 
Lifesaving 
Luge 
Lumberjack Championships 
Martial arts: Judo, Karate, Kick boxing, Kung Fu 
Monster trucks 
Motorcycle daredevil jumps 
Motorcycle racing: Track racing, cross country racing, steeplechase racing, motocross, ice racing, side car racing 
Parachuting 
Platform tennis 
Polo 
Pool 
Rattlesnake hunt 
Rodeo 
Roller skating 
Rowing 
Rugby 
Running: Marathon, Mini-marathon, cross country, endurance running (100 miles) 
Running of the bulls 
Skateboarding 
Skiing: Alpine skiing, cross country skiing, speed skiing 
Ski jumping: Jumping, Flying, Acrobatic 
Sky diving 
Snowboarding 
Snowmobile racing 
Soap box derby 
Soccer 
Softball 
Special Olympics 
Speed skating: Long track, Short track 
Sumo wrestling 
Surfing 
Swimming 
Synchronized swimming 
Table tennis 
Tennis 
Tobogganing 
Track and Field 
Trampoline 
Triathlon: Ironman, Winter Ironman 
Volleyball 
Water polo 
Water skiing 
Water ski kite flying 
Weightlifting 
Wrestling 
Wrist wrestling 
X Games: Summer, Winter

References

External links
Wide World of Sports Events

Wide World of Sports (American TV series)
Announcers